The Night Logan Woke Up is a Canadian thriller drama limited television series, directed by Xavier Dolan and released in 2022. Adapted from the theatrical play La nuit où Laurier Gaudreault s'est réveillé by Michel Marc Bouchard, the series centres on the Larouches, a family in Val-des-Chutes, Quebec, who are coping with the death of family matriarch Madeleine (Anne Dorval).

The series alternates between the present day, when prodigal daughter Mimi/Mireille (Julie Le Breton), a prominent thanatologist who returns home for the first time in decades to honour her mother's dying request that she come home to embalm the body, and the early 1990s, when Mireille (Jasmine Lemée) and her brother Jules/Julien (Elijah Patrice-Baudelot) were close friends with Logan Goodyear/Laurier Gaudreault (Pier-Gabriel Lajoie) until the event that shattered the family.

The cast also includes Patrick Hivon as the adult Jules/Julien, Éric Bruneau as brother Denis, Dolan as youngest brother Elliot and Magalie Lépine-Blondeau as Julien's wife Chantal, as well as Julianne Côté, Guylaine Tremblay, Jacques Lavallée and Sylvie Drapeau in supporting roles. Much of the core cast played the Larouches in the original 2019 stage production of Bouchard's play.

The series premiered November 24, 2022 on Club Illico, and January 23, 2023 on Canal+ in France. Its English version was screened in the Indie Episodic program at the 2023 Sundance Film Festival, with Canadian and American broadcast details to be announced.

Episodes

References

External links

2022 Canadian television series debuts
2022 Canadian television series endings
2020s Canadian drama television series
Club Illico original programming